Mirag (also Romanized as Mīrag; also known as Mīrak) is a village in Mahidasht Rural District, Mahidasht District, Kermanshah County, Kermanshah Province, Iran. At the 2006 census, its population was 175, in 42 families.

References 

Populated places in Kermanshah County